Rexiter Capital Management Limited (Rexiter) is a former investment management firm which specialised exclusively in emerging markets and Asian investments. At the end of December 2010, Rexiter's assets under management totaled $4.5 billion (USD). Rexiter serviced institutional investors around the world from their London, Singapore, Korea and Boston offices.

History 
Rexiter was built around the global emerging markets and Asian team at Kleinwort Benson Investment Management (KBIM), latterly Dresdner RCM Global Advisors. The team left KBIM in 1997 following the merger with Dresdner RCM and set up a new company specialising in emerging markets and Asian investments. As a result, Rexiter was formed as a subsidiary of State Street in August 1997.

Rexiter was part of the State Street Global Alliance, jointly owned by State Street and APG. The company was dissolved in September 2015.

References

External links 
 www.rexiter.com
 www.ssga.com
 Reuters article 
 Interactive media awards

Investment management companies of the United Kingdom
Financial services companies established in 1997